Jean-René Farthouat (26 June 1934 – 11 January 2020) was a French lawyer who served as Bâtonnier of the Paris Bar Association from 1994 to 1995.

Decorations
Commander of the Legion of Honour

References

20th-century French lawyers
1934 births
2020 deaths
Commandeurs of the Légion d'honneur